A referendum on the reform programme of the military junta was held in Colombia on 1 December 1957. Women were given the vote for the first time, and the programme was approved by 95% of voters.

Background
After a coup d'état on 10 May 1957, the ruling military junta issued decree 0247, calling for a referendum on constitutional reforms and the election of a Constitutional Council on 16 March 1958, as well as allowing the Liberal Party and Conservative Party to form a provisional government.

Results

References

Referendums in Colombia
Constitutional reform referendum
Colombia
Constitutional reform referendum,1957
Colombia
December 1957 events in South America